Miguel David Collado Morales (Santo Domingo, Dominican Republic, September 29, 1975) is a Dominican politician and businessman. He served as Mayor of Santo Domingo, National District from 2016 to 2020.

Career
In the general elections of 2016 he represented the Modern Revolutionary Party through his nomination to the Mayor's Office of the city of the Dominican Republic; Santo Domingo, which ended up winning when computing 57.28% of the votes counted against Roberto Salcedo, candidate of the Dominican Liberation Party and allies, which has achieved 36.45%.

See also 

    
Luis Abinader
Carolina Mejía de Garrigó
Leonel Fernández
Danilo Medina
Margarita Cedeño de Fernández
Luis Almagro
Adriano Espaillat
Geovanny Vicente
Tom Pérez
Faride Raful
José Ignacio Paliza

References

1975 births
Living people
Dominican Republic businesspeople
Mayors of places in the Dominican Republic
Modern Revolutionary Party politicians
People from Santo Domingo
Social Christian Reformist Party politicians